Luxembourg competed at the 1948 Summer Olympics in London, England. 45 competitors, 42 men and 3 women, took part in 32 events in 8 sports.

Athletics

Boxing

Canoeing

Cycling

Four cyclists, all men, represented Luxembourg in 1948.

Individual road race
 Robert Bintz
 Marcel Ernzer
 Henri Kellen
 Pitty Scheer

Team road race
 Robert Bintz
 Marcel Ernzer
 Henri Kellen
 Pitty Scheer

Fencing

Six fencers, all men, represented Luxembourg in 1948.

Men's foil
 Émile Gretsch
 Léon Buck
 Gust Lamesch

Men's épée
 Émile Gretsch
 Paul Anen
 Jean-Fernand Leischen

Men's team épée
 Jean-Fernand Leischen, Paul Anen, Émile Gretsch, Gust Lamesch, Erny Putz

Football

Gymnastics

Wrestling

References

External links
Official Olympic Reports

Nations at the 1948 Summer Olympics
1948
1948 in Luxembourgian sport